Aradan (also Romanized as Ārādān; also known as Ardān and Āzādān) is the capital of Aradan County, Semnan Province, Iran. At the 2006 census, its population was 4,959, in 1,380 families.

It corresponds with the ancient city of Choara (Khuwar), located in the historical region of Qumis, along the Great Khorasan Road.

It is the birthplace of the former President of Iran, Mahmoud Ahmadinejad.

References

Populated places in Aradan County

Cities in Semnan Province
Qumis (region)